The following is an episode list for the TV series How the West Was Won.

Series overview

Episodes

Movie (1976)

Season 1 (1977)

Season 2 (1978)

Season 3 (1979)

External links

The Macahans at tvguide.com
How the West Was Won at tvguide.com
How the West Was Won - Season 1 at Amazon Prime Video
How the West Was Won - Season 2 at Amazon Prime Video
How the West Was Won - Season 3 at Amazon Prime Video

How the West Was Won
Lists of American Western (genre) television series episodes